Jesse Underwood McKinley (born 1970) is an American journalist who is currently Albany bureau chief at The New York Times and covers the COVID-19 pandemic.

Early life and education
McKinley grew up in Kansas City, Missouri. He is the son of James C. McKinley, former University of Missouri, Kansas City (UMKC) English professor, editor of New Letters, and writer and Mary Ann Underwood, a former continuing education program manager also at UMKC. McKinley has three siblings: Older brother James C. McKinley Jr. is a long-time reporter and is currently an editor on the Metro desk at The New York Times specializing in criminal justice and law enforcement; brother Gabe McKinley also worked at The New York Times for over 12 years and is now a playwright; and sister Molly McKinley also worked at The Times before moving into a career in film and television as an editor and writer based out of Santa Fe, New Mexico.

In 1992, McKinley received a B.F.A. from New York University Tisch School of the Arts, where he was part of the Experimental Theatre Wing.

Career
McKinley has worked at The New York Times in various capacities since 1988. When he was in college, his older brother was a reporter at The Times and got him a job as a copy boy. This led to eventually reporting on local news, covering a shooting at the World Trade Center, the Union Square train accident, and the 1989 anniversary of the Tompkins Square Park riot (1988). 
 
From the early 1990s to the year 2000, McKinley worked as a freelance reporter. From 1994 to 1996, as a freelancer, McKinley wrote the FYI column for the City Weekly section of The New York Times, where he responded to reader questions about local trivia.

From 1996 to 1997, McKinley worked in San Francisco as a stringer for The New York Times, where he covered 1996's Proposition 209 aka California Civil Rights Initiative (CCRI), the 1997 Heaven's Gate suicides, and other breaking news.

In 1998, McKinley returned to New York and worked as a freelance reporter in the Culture section, where he covered Broadway and wrote the "On Stage and Off" column from 1998 to 2003. In 2000, McKinley was hired as a full time reporter at The New York Times, continuing to work on content for the Culture section until 2006.

In 2006, McKinley moved back to San Francisco, where he was the San Francisco bureau chief for The New York Times. During this time, he covered the 2008 California Proposition 8, a California ballot proposition and a state constitutional amendment that was against Same-sex marriage in California.

McKinley is currently the Albany bureau chief of The New York Times. In 2014, McKinley was named as one of the top reporters working out of state capitals.

McKinley regularly appears on the WAMC audio podcast, The Capitol Connection, hosted by Alan Chartock.

During the COVID-19 pandemic, McKinley has attended daily press briefings given by New York Governor Andrew Cuomo, covering Cuomo's response to the crisis.

Other work
In 1995, McKinley wrote the "off off Broadway" play called Quick Bright Things, which was loosely based on A Midsummer Night's Dream. He wrote a feature article about the experience for The New York Times. McKinley was a regular panelist on the Emmy-award winning nationally syndicated talk show about theater called Theater Talk, which aired on PBS and later CUNY TV.

McKinley has appeared in the 2003 FringeNYC festival in Bess Wohl's play, Cats Talk Back and in 2007 appeared in a San Francisco based installment of Literary Death Match called "Cyrillic Battle to the Death".

Personal life
In 2003, McKinley married Lindsey Gates. The marriage ended in divorce, which he wrote about in a 2012 piece for The New York Times.

Selected works

References

External links
 Jesse McKinley at The New York Times

Living people
1970 births
Place of birth missing (living people)
American male journalists
The New York Times writers
New York University alumni